was a Japanese businessman and one of the most influential figures in the Japanese construction industry. He was Honorary Chairman of Kajima Corporation, one of the biggest construction companies in Japan, from 2005 until his death. Prior to that, he was president and chairman of Kajima Corporation. He was married to Yoshiko (née Kajima), a daughter of the fourth president and the founding family of Kajima, Morinoske Kajima. His father was Ichiro Ishikawa, the first Chairman of the Japan Business Federation.

Ishikawa held several senior positions in a number of prominent organizations. He served as chairman of the Japan Chamber of Commerce and Industry (JCCI) from 1987 to 1993, chairman of the Japan Federation of Construction Contractors, president of the Japan Society of Civil Engineers and president of the Japan Federation of Engineering Societies among others. An active member of the international community, Dr. Ishikawa served as head of the Japan - Midwest U.S. Association and the Pacific Basin Economic Council (PBEC), and participated as a senior member in management forums and missions to various countries around the world. He also chaired international friendship associations such as the Japan-Italy Association and the Japan-Egypt Friendship Association.

Life 

Ishikawa was born to an influential family in Tokyo, as a son of Ichiro Ishikawa, a former chairman of the Japan Business Federation and a managing director of a big chemical company (now, Nissan Chemical Industries after the merger). He graduated from Tokyo Imperial University(currently, Tokyo University) in 1948. After graduating from Tokyo University, Ishikawa joined the Department of Transportation (currently Ministry of Land, Infrastructure, Transport and Tourism) and became acquainted with Morinoske Kajima, fourth president of Kajima Corporation. Morinoske Kajima noticed his potential early on and they became close. In 1955, Dr. Ishikawa joined Kajima as a director. Dr. Ishikawa was convinced that nuclear energy was required to satisfy future energy demands in Japan and created a department for nuclear energy in Kajima soon after joining. In addition, he led many successful construction projects such as Kasumigaseki Building, the first skyscraper in Japan. In 1978, he took office as the seventh president of Kajima and swiftly introduced TQC (Total Quality Control) and promoted positive reforms in the company. He became chairman of Kajima in 1984 and in 1986, was awarded by the Government of Japan with Medals of Honor (Japan) with Blue Ribbon (藍綬褒章).

In May 1987, Dr. Ishikawa took office as the 15th president of the Japan Chamber of Commerce and Industry being strongly recommended by the 14th president, Noboru Goto. During his term, he was supportive of the consumption tax (VAT). He also held, among other positions, the position of Chairman of the Japan-Italy Association (日伊協会会長), Director of the Japan-Germany Association (日独協会理事), Director of the Japan-Belgium Association (日本・ベルギー協会理事), Director of Keio Engineering Society (慶應工学会), Senior Advisor to the ESUJ, Director of Japan Music Foundation (ジェスク音楽文化振興会, JESC), Senior Advisor to the Society for Promotion of Japanese Diplomacy (日本外交協会, SPJD) and Director of Japan Productivity Centre (日本生産性本部).

Dr. Ishikawa died on 14 December 2005 at the age of 80.

Chronology 

1925 – Born
1945 – Graduated from Tokyo University
1945 – Joined the Ministry of Land, Infrastructure and Transport
1955 – Joined Kajima Corporation as director
1957 – Appointed as managing director of Kajima Corporation
1959 – Appointed as  vice-president of Kajima Corporation
1960 – Appointed as chairman of JCI -Japan
1974 – Appointed as representative of Japan Association of Corporate Executives
1978 – Appointed as president of Kajima Corporation
1982 – Appointed as chairman of the Association of Civil Engineering in Japan
1984 – Appointed as chairman of Kajima Corporation
1984 – Appointed as director of Japan Business Federation
1985 – Appointed as 5th chairman of Japan Federation of Construction Contractors
1986 – Awarded by the Government of Japan with Medals of Honor with Blue Ribbon
1987 – Appointed as chairman of the Japan Chamber of Commerce and Industry
1987 – Appointed as chairman of the Tokyo Chamber of Commerce and Industry
1987 – Appointed as chairman of Japan Society of Civil Engineers
1987 – Appointed as director of New Japan Philharmonic
1988 – Appointed as 13th chairman of the International Chamber of Commerce and Industry – Japan
1991 – Appointed as chairman of the Japan Federation of Engineering Societies
1991 – Appointed as 14th chairman of Japan Table Tennis Association
1992 – Awarded by the Government of Peru with an Order of the Sun (Peru) (太陽勲章大十字位)
1994 – Appointed as honorary chairman of Kajima Corporation
1995 – Appointed as chairman of Tokyo University Alumni Association (東京銀杏会)
1997 – Appointed as 7th honorary chairman of Japan Table Tennis Association
2000 – Awarded by the Government of Italy with a Cavaliere di Gran Croce (1st Class Knight Grand Cross)
2005 – Death

Family

References 

『私の履歴書』 平成14年（2002年）7月日本経済新聞連載, ASIN B0053O67Z0
石川六郎『海外建設プロジェクトと建設輸出（新体系土木工学 別巻）』 技報堂出版、1982年、
『私の履歴書（第37巻）』 日本経済新聞社、（全38巻）、（第25～38巻）※分売不可
石川六郎『婦人問題講演集（第1巻）』 日本図書センター、2003年、
菊池久『血統商法―鹿島建設会長石川六郎の眼力とあくなき挑戦』　ぴいぷる社、1988年、

Businesspeople from Tokyo
Japanese chairpersons of corporations
Japanese chief executives
1925 births
2005 deaths
Presidents of the Japan Society of Civil Engineers